Butyric acid (from , meaning "butter"), also known under the systematic name butanoic acid, is a straight-chain alkyl carboxylic acid with the chemical formula . It is an oily, colorless liquid with an unpleasant odor. Isobutyric acid (2-methylpropanoic acid) is an isomer. Salts and esters of butyric acid are known as butyrates or butanoates. The acid does not occur widely in nature, but its esters are widespread. It is a common industrial chemical and an important component in the mammalian gut.

History
Butyric acid was first observed in impure form in 1814 by the French chemist Michel Eugène Chevreul. By 1818, he had purified it sufficiently to characterize it. However, Chevreul did not publish his early research on butyric acid; instead, he deposited his findings in manuscript form with the secretary of the Academy of Sciences in Paris, France. Henri Braconnot, a French chemist, was also researching the composition of butter and was publishing his findings, and this led to disputes about priority. As early as 1815, Chevreul claimed that he had found the substance responsible for the smell of butter. By 1817, he published some of his findings regarding the properties of butyric acid and named it. However, it was not until 1823 that he presented the properties of butyric acid in detail. The Latin name butyrum (or buturum) is similar.

Occurrence
Triglycerides of butyric acid compose 3–4% of butter. When butter goes rancid, butyric acid is liberated from the glyceride by hydrolysis. It is one of the fatty acid subgroup called short-chain fatty acids. Butyric acid is a typical carboxylic acid that reacts with bases and affects many metals.
It is found in animal fat and plant oils, bovine milk, breast milk, butter, parmesan cheese, body odor, vomit, and as a product of anaerobic fermentation (including in the colon). It has a taste somewhat like butter and an unpleasant odor. Mammals with good scent detection abilities, such as dogs, can detect it at 10 parts per billion, whereas humans can detect it only in concentrations above 10 parts per million. In food manufacturing, it is used as a flavoring agent.

In humans, butyric acid is one of two primary endogenous agonists of human hydroxycarboxylic acid receptor 2, a  G protein-coupled receptor.

Butyric acid is present as its octyl ester in parsnip (Pastinaca sativa) and in the seed of the ginkgo tree.

Production

Industrial
In industry, butyric acid is produced by hydroformylation from propene and syngas, forming butyraldehyde, which is oxidised to the final product.
  butyric acid
It can be separated from aqueous solutions by saturation with salts such as calcium chloride.  The calcium salt, is less soluble in hot water than in cold.

Microbial biosynthesis

Butyrate is produced by several fermentation processes performed by obligate anaerobic bacteria. This fermentation pathway was discovered by Louis Pasteur in 1861. Examples of butyrate-producing species of bacteria:

Clostridium butyricum
Clostridium kluyveri
Clostridium pasteurianum
Faecalibacterium prausnitzii
Fusobacterium nucleatum
Butyrivibrio fibrisolvens
Eubacterium limosum

The pathway starts with the glycolytic cleavage of glucose to two molecules of pyruvate, as happens in most organisms. Pyruvate is oxidized into acetyl coenzyme A catalyzed by pyruvate:ferredoxin oxidoreductase. Two molecules of carbon dioxide and two molecules of hydrogen are formed as waste products. Subsequently,  is produced in the last step of the fermentation. Three molecules of ATP are produced for each glucose molecule, a relatively high yield. The balanced equation for this fermentation is

Other pathways to butyrate include succinate reduction and crotonate disproportionation.

Several species form acetone and n-butanol in an alternative pathway, which starts as butyrate fermentation. Some of these species are:
Clostridium acetobutylicum, the most prominent acetone and butanol producer, used also in industry
Clostridium beijerinckii
Clostridium tetanomorphum
Clostridium aurantibutyricum

These bacteria begin with butyrate fermentation, as described above, but, when the pH drops below 5, they switch into butanol and acetone production to prevent further lowering of the pH. Two molecules of butanol are formed for each molecule of acetone.

The change in the pathway occurs after acetoacetyl CoA formation. This intermediate then takes two possible pathways:
acetoacetyl CoA → acetoacetate → acetone
acetoacetyl CoA → butyryl CoA → butyraldehyde → butanol

Fermentable fiber sources
Highly-fermentable fiber residues, such as those from resistant starch, oat bran, pectin, and guar are transformed by colonic bacteria into short-chain fatty acids (SCFA) including butyrate, producing more SCFA than less fermentable fibers such as celluloses.  One study found that resistant starch consistently produces more butyrate than other types of dietary fiber.  The production of SCFA from fibers in ruminant animals such as cattle is responsible for the butyrate content of milk and butter.

Fructans are another source of prebiotic soluble dietary fibers which can be digested to produce butyrate. They are often found in the soluble fibers of foods which are high in sulfur, such as the allium and cruciferous vegetables. Sources of fructans include wheat (although some wheat strains such as spelt contain lower amounts), rye, barley, onion, garlic, Jerusalem and globe artichoke, asparagus, beetroot, chicory, dandelion leaves, leek, radicchio, the white part of spring onion, broccoli, brussels sprouts, cabbage, fennel and prebiotics, such as fructooligosaccharides (FOS), oligofructose, and inulin.

Reactions
Butyric acid reacts as a typical carboxylic acid: it can form amide, ester, anhydride, and chloride derivatives. The latter, butyryl chloride, is commonly used as the intermediate to obtain the others.

Uses
Butyric acid is used in the preparation of various butyrate esters. It is used to produce cellulose acetate butyrate (CAB), which is used in a wide variety of tools, paints, and coatings, and is more resistant to degradation than cellulose acetate. CAB can degrade with exposure to heat and moisture, releasing butyric acid.

Low-molecular-weight esters of butyric acid, such as methyl butyrate, have mostly pleasant aromas or tastes. As a consequence, they are used as food and perfume additives. It is an approved food flavoring in the EU FLAVIS database (number 08.005).

Due to its powerful odor, it has also been used as a fishing bait additive. Many of the commercially available flavors used in carp (Cyprinus carpio) baits use butyric acid as their ester base. It is not clear whether fish are attracted by the butyric acid itself or the substances added to it. Butyric acid was one of the few organic acids shown to be palatable for both tench and bitterling. The substance has been used as a stink bomb by Sea Shepherd Conservation Society to disrupt Japanese whaling crews.

Pharmacology

Pharmacodynamics 

Butyric acid (pKa 4.82) is fully ionized at physiological pH, so its anion is the material that is mainly relevant in biological systems.
It is one of two primary endogenous agonists of human hydroxycarboxylic acid receptor 2 (also known as GPR109A), a  G protein-coupled receptor (GPCR),

Like other short-chain fatty acids (SCFAs), butyrate is an agonist at the free fatty acid receptors FFAR2 and FFAR3, which function as nutrient sensors that facilitate the homeostatic control of energy balance; however, among the group of SCFAs, only butyrate is an agonist of HCA2. It is also an HDAC inhibitor (specifically, HDAC1, HDAC2, HDAC3, and HDAC8), a drug that inhibits the function of histone deacetylase enzymes, thereby favoring an acetylated state of histones in cells. Histone acetylation loosens the structure of chromatin by reducing the electrostatic attraction between histones and DNA.  In general, it is thought that transcription factors will be unable to access regions where histones are tightly associated with DNA (i.e., non-acetylated, e.g., heterochromatin). Therefore, butyric acid is thought to enhance the transcriptional activity at promoters, which are typically silenced or downregulated due to histone deacetylase activity.

Pharmacokinetics
Butyrate that is produced in the colon through microbial fermentation of dietary fiber is primarily absorbed and metabolized by colonocytes and the liver for the generation of ATP during energy metabolism; however, some butyrate is absorbed in the distal colon, which is not connected to the portal vein, thereby allowing for the systemic distribution of butyrate to multiple organ systems through the circulatory system. Butyrate that has reached systemic circulation can readily cross the blood–brain barrier via monocarboxylate transporters (i.e., certain members of the SLC16A group of transporters). Other transporters that mediate the passage of butyrate across lipid membranes include SLC5A8 (SMCT1), SLC27A1 (FATP1), and SLC27A4 (FATP4).

Metabolism 

Butyric acid is metabolized by various human XM-ligases (ACSM1, ACSM2B, ASCM3, ACSM4, ACSM5, and ACSM6), also known as butyrate–CoA ligase.  The metabolite produced by this reaction is butyryl–CoA, and is produced as follows:
Adenosine triphosphate + butyric acid + coenzyme A → adenosine monophosphate + pyrophosphate + butyryl-CoA
As a short-chain fatty acid, butyrate is metabolized by mitochondria as an energy (i.e., adenosine triphosphate or ATP) source through fatty acid metabolism. In particular, it is an important energy source for cells lining the mammalian colon (colonocytes). Without butyrates, colon cells undergo autophagy (i.e., self-digestion) and die.

In humans, the butyrate precursor tributyrin, which is naturally present in butter, is metabolized by triacylglycerol lipase into dibutyrin and butyrate through the reaction:
Tributyrin +  dibutyrin + butyric acid

Biochemistry

Butyrate has numerous effects on energy homeostasis and related diseases (diabetes and obesity), inflammation, and immune function (e.g., it has pronounced antimicrobial and anticarcinogenic effects) in humans. These effects occur through its metabolism by mitochondria to generate  during fatty acid metabolism or through one or more of its histone-modifying enzyme targets (i.e., the class I histone deacetylases) and G-protein coupled receptor targets (i.e., FFAR2, FFAR3, and ).

In the mammalian gut
Butyrate is essential to host immune homeostasis. Although the role and importance of butyrate in the gut is not fully understood, many researchers argue that a depletion of butyrate-producing bacteria in patients with several vasculitic conditions is essential to the pathogenesis of these disorders. A depletion of butyrate in the gut is typically caused by an absence or depletion of butyrate-producing-bacteria (BPB). This depletion in BPB leads to microbial dysbiosis. This is characterized by an overall low biodiversity and a depletion of key butyrate-producing members. Butyrate is an essential microbial metabolite with a vital role as a modulator of proper immune function in the host. It has been shown that children lacking in BPB are more susceptible to allergic disease and Type 1 Diabetes. Butyrate is also reduced in a diet low in fiber which can induce inflammation and have other adverse affects insofar as these short-chain fatty acids activate PPAR-γ.

Butyrate exerts a key role for the maintenance of immune homeostasis both locally (in the gut) and systemically (via circulating butyrate). It has been shown to promote the differentiation of regulatory T cells. In particular, circulating butyrate prompts the generation of extrathymic regulatory T cells. The low-levels of butyrate in human subjects could favor reduced regulatory T cell-mediated control, thus promoting a powerful immuno-pathological T-cell response. On the other hand, gut butyrate has been reported to inhibit local pro-inflammatory cytokines. The absence or depletion of these BPB in the gut could therefore be a possible aide in the overly-active inflammatory response. Butyrate in the gut also protects the integrity of the intestinal epithelial barrier. Decreased butyrate levels therefore lead to a damaged or dysfunctional intestinal epithelial barrier.

In a 2013 research study conducted by Furusawa et al., microbe-derived butyrate was found to be essential in inducing the differentiation of colonic regulatory T cells in mice. This is of great importance and possibly relevant to the pathogenesis and vasculitis associated with many inflammatory diseases because regulatory T cells have a central role in the suppression of inflammatory and allergic responses. In several research studies, it has been demonstrated that butyrate induced the differentiation of regulatory T cells in vitro and in vivo. The anti-inflammatory capacity of butyrate has been extensively analyzed and supported by many studies. It has been found that microorganism-produced butyrate expedites the production of regulatory T cells, although the specific mechanism by which it does so unclear. More recently, it has been shown that butyrate plays an essential and direct role in modulating gene expression of cytotoxic T-cells. Butyrate also has an anti-inflammatory effect on neutrophils, reducing their migration to wounds. This effect is mediated via the receptor 

In the gut microbiomes found in the class Mammalia, omnivores and herbivores have butyrate-producing bacterial communities dominated by the butyryl-CoA:acetate CoA-transferase pathway, whereas carnivores have butyrate-producing bacterial communities dominated by the butyrate kinase pathway.

Immunomodulation and inflammation
Butyrate's effects on the immune system are mediated through the inhibition of class I histone deacetylases and activation of its G-protein coupled receptor targets:  (GPR109A), FFAR2 (GPR43), and FFAR3 (GPR41). Among the short-chain fatty acids, butyrate is the most potent promoter of intestinal regulatory T cells in vitro and the only one among the group that is an  ligand. It has been shown to be a critical mediator of the colonic inflammatory response. It possesses both preventive and therapeutic potential to counteract inflammation-mediated ulcerative colitis and colorectal cancer.

Butyrate has established antimicrobial properties in humans that are mediated through the antimicrobial peptide LL-37, which it induces via HDAC inhibition on histone H3. In vitro, butyrate increases gene expression of FOXP3 (the transcription regulator for ) and promotes colonic regulatory T cells (Tregs) through the inhibition of class I histone deacetylases; through these actions, it increases the expression of interleukin 10, an anti-inflammatory cytokine. Butyrate also suppresses colonic inflammation by inhibiting the IFN-γ–STAT1 signaling pathways, which is mediated partially through histone deacetylase inhibition. While transient IFN-γ signaling is generally associated with normal host immune response, chronic IFN-γ signaling is often associated with chronic inflammation. It has been shown that butyrate inhibits activity of HDAC1 that is bound to the Fas gene promoter in T cells, resulting in hyperacetylation of the Fas promoter and up-regulation of Fas receptor on the T-cell surface.

Similar to other  agonists studied, butyrate also produces marked anti-inflammatory effects in a variety of tissues, including the brain, gastrointestinal tract, skin, and vascular tissue. Butyrate binding at FFAR3 induces neuropeptide Y release and promotes the functional homeostasis of colonic mucosa and the enteric immune system.

Cancer
Butyrate has been shown to be a critical mediator of the colonic inflammatory response. It is responsible for about 70% of energy from the colonocytes, being a critical SCFA in colon homeostasis. Butyrate possesses both preventive and therapeutic potential to counteract inflammation-mediated ulcerative colitis (UC) and colorectal cancer. It produces different effects in healthy and cancerous cells: this is known as the "butyrate paradox". In particular, butyrate inhibits colonic tumor cells and stimulates proliferation of healthy colonic epithelial cells. The explanation why butyrate is an energy source for normal colonocytes and induces apoptosis in colon cancer cells, is the Warburg effect in cancer cells, which leads to butyrate not being properly metabolized. This phenomenon leads to the accumulation of butyrate in the nucleus, acting as a histone deacetylase (HDAC) inhibitor. One mechanism underlying butyrate function in suppression of colonic inflammation is inhibition of the IFN-γ/STAT1 signalling pathways. It has been shown that butyrate inhibits activity of HDAC1 that is bound to the Fas gene promoter in T cells, resulting in hyperacetylation of the Fas promoter and upregulation of Fas receptor on the T cell surface. It is thus suggested that butyrate enhances apoptosis of T cells in the colonic tissue and thereby eliminates the source of inflammation (IFN-γ production). Butyrate inhibits angiogenesis by inactivating Sp1 transcription factor activity and downregulating vascular endothelial growth factor gene expression.

In summary, the production of volatile fatty acids such as butyrate from fermentable fibers may contribute to the role of dietary fiber in colon cancer. Short-chain fatty acids, which include butyric acid, are produced by beneficial colonic bacteria (probiotics) that feed on, or ferment prebiotics, which are plant products that contain dietary fiber. These short-chain fatty acids benefit the colonocytes by increasing energy production, and may protect against colon cancer by inhibiting cell proliferation.

Conversely, some researchers have sought to eliminate butyrate and consider it a potential cancer driver. Studies in mice indicate it drives transformation of MSH2-deficient colon epithelial cells.

Potential treatments from butyrate restoration
Owing to the importance of butyrate as an inflammatory regulator and immune system contributor, butyrate depletions could be a key factor influencing the pathogenesis of many vasculitic conditions. It is thus essential to maintain healthy levels of butyrate in the gut. Fecal microbiota transplants (to restore BPB and symbiosis in the gut) could be effective by replenishing butyrate levels. In this treatment, a healthy individual donates their stool to be transplanted into an individual with dysbiosis. A less-invasive treatment option is the administration of butyrate—as oral supplements or enemas—which has been shown to be very effective in terminating symptoms of inflammation with minimal-to-no side-effects. In a study where patients with ulcerative colitis were treated with butyrate enemas, inflammation decreased significantly, and bleeding ceased completely after butyrate provision.

Addiction

Butyric acid is an  inhibitor that is selective for class I HDACs in humans. HDACs are histone-modifying enzymes that can cause histone deacetylation and repression of gene expression. HDACs are important regulators of synaptic formation, synaptic plasticity, and long-term memory formation. Class I HDACs are known to be involved in mediating the development of an addiction. Butyric acid and other HDAC inhibitors have been used in preclinical research to assess the transcriptional, neural, and behavioral effects of HDAC inhibition in animals addicted to drugs.

Butyrate salts and esters
The butyrate or butanoate ion, is the conjugate base of butyric acid. It is the form found in biological systems at physiological pH. A butyric (or butanoic) compound is a carboxylate salt or ester of butyric acid.

Examples

Salts
 Sodium butyrate

Esters
 Butyl butyrate
 Butyryl-CoA
 Cellulose acetate butyrate (aircraft dope)
 Estradiol benzoate butyrate
 Ethyl butyrate
 Methyl butyrate
 Pentyl butyrate
 Tributyrin

See also 
 List of saturated fatty acids
 Histone
 Histone-modifying enzyme
 Histone acetylase
 Histone deacetylase
 Hydroxybutyric acids
 α-Hydroxybutyric acid
 β-Hydroxybutyric acid
 γ-Hydroxybutyric acid 
 β-Methylbutyric acid
 β-Hydroxy β-methylbutyric acid

Notes

References

External links 

 NIST Standard Reference Data for butanoic acid

GABA analogues
Flavors
Alkanoic acids
Fatty acids
Foul-smelling chemicals
Biomolecules
Histone deacetylase inhibitors